Aechmea fraudulosa is a plant species in the genus Aechmea. This species is endemic to the State of Bahia in eastern Brazil.

References

fraudulosa
Flora of Brazil
Plants described in 1889